Jianggao is a town in Baiyun District, Guangzhou, Guangdong, China.

References 

Baiyun District, Guangzhou
Towns in Guangdong